HMS Vesta was an Adonis-class  schooner of the Royal Navy during the Napoleonic War. She was built at Bermuda using Bermudan cedar and completed in 1806. She appears to have had an astonishingly uneventful decade-long career before the Admiralty sold her in 1816. She became a merchantman, sailing between the United Kingdom and Newfoundland until May 1823 when she sank after hitting an iceberg.

Career
Vesta was commissioned in August 1806 under the command of Lieutenant George Maule for the North America station. In November 1807 Lieutenant Charles Crowdy assumed command. His replacement in June 1808 was Lieutenant George Mends.

Lieutenant George Miall replaced Mends in July 1809. In 1810, Lieutenant William Bowen Mends briefly commanded Vesta before Miall returned to command. Between 18 June and 5 July 1811, Vesta underwent repairs at Plymouth.

Vesta then served briefly with the West Africa Squadron.

On 30 December Vesta and  captured Princessa de Beira (or Princess Beira) off Boa Vista, Cape Verde. Princessa de Beira was a United States schooner. The Vice admiralty court at Freetown condemned her, and freed the 56 slaves that she was carrying. The court ruled that Princessa was in fact U.S. and that her Portuguese colours were false.

Then on 13 January 1812, Vesta and Sabrina captured Pepe, a U.S.-owned slave schooner, in the River Gamabia. The court in Sierra Leone condemned her and freed the 73 slaves she was carrying. The court ruled that despite her  Spanish colours, Pepe was American and British property. In the seizure Captain Tillard of Sabrina used dubious means to induce the local slave merchant to add 64 slaves to the nine already aboard Pepe at the time of the seizure and so make the exercise more lucrative.

In February Vesta sailed to the Rio Pongas to attempt to capture four British subjects engaging in slave trading in violation of the law for the abolition of the slave trade. Miall managed to apprehend two and bring them back to Freetown.

Vesta then returned to England.

Lloyd's List (LL) reported on 12 February 1813 that the schooner Vesta had recaptured the English merchantman  which a French privateer had captured off Cartagena, Spain, during a calm. Vesta brought Hebe into Gibraltar.

On 1 October 1813, Vesta recaptured the Spanish brig St. Francisco de Assis.

Disposal
In January 1816 the Admiralty put Vesta up for sale at Deptford. She was sold for £500 on 11 January 1816.

Merchantman
Vesta appeared in the Register of Shipping for 1818 with Ford, master, and W. Major, owner.

Loss
Vesta was sailing from Poole and Waterford to Carbonear when on 20 May 1823 she struck an iceberg about 100 miles east of Cape St Francis. The crew took to the boats and she sank almost immediately. About 30 hours later Elizabeth, Hearn, master, of Harbour Grace, came by and rescued the crew. Elizabeth was on a seal hunting voyage. She landed the crew a few days later at Musquito.

Notes

Citations

References
 Admiralty (1835) The Navy List. (Great Britain; H.M. Stationery Office).
 
 Mends, Bowen Stilon (1899) Life of Admiral Sir William Robert Mends, G. C. B.: late director of transports. (J. Murray).
  

 

1806 ships
Adonis-class schooners
Ships of the West Africa Squadron
Age of Sail merchant ships
Merchant ships of the United Kingdom
Maritime incidents in May 1823
Ships built in Bermuda